The Château de Montreuil-Bonnin is a castle located in Montreuil-Bonnin, department of Vienne, in the Nouvelle-Aquitaine region of France.

History
The castle is recorded early in the 11th century, as a possession of the Count of Poitou.

References
Hare, Augustus John Cuthbert. South-western France. G. Allen, 1890

Castles in Nouvelle-Aquitaine